Rolf Wilhelm Brednich (born February 1935 in Worms) is a German Europeanist ethnologist and ethnographer (Volkskundler) and folklorist.

Biography 
Brednich studied Volkskunde, German studies, history, and theology at the Universities of Tübingen and Mainz, in Germany, getting his doctorate from the latter with a dissertation entitled Volkserzählungen und Volksglaube von den Schicksalsfrauen.

Between 1963 and 1980 he was the leader of the Deutsches Volksliedarchiv in Freiburg.  From 1965 through 1974  he was head of the commission for song, music and dance research within the Deutsche Gesellschaft für Volkskunde. From 1969 und 1881, he taught at the University of Freiburg, receiving his habilitation in 1973 with his Die Liedpublizistik im Flugblatt des 15. bis 17. Jahrhunderts.

In 1975 Brednich edited the Volkskunde-Bibliographie. In 
1982 he became editor-in-chief of the Encyclopedia of the Folktale and co-editor of the journal Fabula.  Between 1983 and 1999 he was head of the Volkskundliche Kommission für Niedersachsen e.V. and from 1991 through 1999 head of the Deutsche Gesellschaft für Volkskunde e.V.. In 2000 he was designated Senior Honorary Research Fellow at Stout Centre of the Victoria University of Wellington in New Zealand.  Since 2005 he has been Visiting Professor of Anthropology at the  School of Social and Cultural Studies at that university.  He has carried out research in Germany, Canada, and New Zealand.

Among the general German-speaking public, he made his name with collections of urban legends, starting with Die Spinne in der Yucca-Palme.

Preise und Auszeichnungen 
 2004 - Brüder-Grimm-Preis der Philipps-Universität Marburg

Selected works 

Volkserzählungen und Volksglaube von den Schicksalsfrauen. Helsinki 1964
Die Ebermannstädter Liederhandschrift. Kulmbach 1972
Handbuch des Volksliedes. with Lutz Röhrich and Wolfgang Suppan, 2 volumes; Munich 1973/1975
Die Liedpublizistik im Flugblatt des 15. bis 17. Jahrhunderts. 2 volumes; Baden-Baden 1974-75.
Die Darfelder Liederhandschrift 1546-1565. Münster 1976.
Mennonite Folklore and Folklife. Ottawa 1977.
Deutsche Comics. Freiburg/Breisgau 1979.
The Bible and the Plough. The Lives of a Hutterite Minister and a Mennonite Farmer. Ottawa 1981.
Die Brüder Grimm in Göttingen 1829-1837. Göttingen 1986.
Die Spinne in der Yucca-Palme. Munich  1990.
Die Maus im Jumbo-Jet. Munich  1991.
Das Huhn mit dem Gipsbein. Munich  1993.
Sagenhafte Geschichten von heute. München 1994.
Die Ratte am Strohhalm. Munich 1996.
Denkmale der Freundschaft. Göttinger Stammbuchkupfer - Quellen der Kulturgeschichte. Niedernjesa 1997. 
Die Hutterer.  Freiburg i. Br. 1998
Grundriß der Volkskunde. Berlin 2001. 
Pinguine in Rückenlage Munich 2004.
www.worldwidewitz.com. Humor im Cyberspace. Freiburg / Basel /Wien 2005.Neuseeland macht Spaß.  MANA-Verlag, Berlin 2007. Tie und Anger. Historische Dorfplätze in Niedersachsen, Thüringen, Hessen und Franken. Friedland 2009.Erzählkultur. Beiträge zur kulturwissenschaftichen Erzählforschung. Berlin / New York 2009.Augustus Koch - Mapmaker. The Life and Work of Augustus Koch (1834-1901): Artist, Designer, Draughtsman and Cartographier (with a contribution by Sascha Nolden). Wellington 2015Überlieferunsgeschichten. Paradigmata volkskundlicher Kulturforschung''. Berlin/Boston 2015.

1935 births
Living people
German ethnologists
German ethnographers
German folklorists
Academic staff of the Victoria University of Wellington
People from Worms, Germany
People from Rhenish Hesse
German male non-fiction writers